The 2021–22 St. Francis Brooklyn Terriers men's basketball team represented St. Francis College in the 2021–22 NCAA Division I men's basketball season. The Terriers, led by 12th-year head coach Glenn Braica, played their home games at Daniel Lynch Gymnasium in Brooklyn Heights, New York as members of the Northeast Conference.

Previous season
In a season limited due to the ongoing COVID-19 pandemic, the Terriers finished the 2020–21 season 9–10, 9–9 in NEC play to finish in eighth place. Due to complications caused by the COVID-19 pandemic, only the top four teams were eligible to participate in the NEC tournament. Therefore, they failed to qualify.

Roster

Schedule and results
NEC COVID-19 policy provided that if a team could not play a conference game due to COVID-19 issues within its program, the game would be declared a forfeit and the other team would receive a conference win. However, wins related to COVID-19 do not count pursuant to NCAA policy.

|-
!colspan=12 style=| Non-conference regular season

|-
!colspan=12 style=| NEC regular season

|-
!colspan=9 style=| NEC Tournament

Source

References

St. Francis Brooklyn Terriers men's basketball seasons
Saint Francis Brooklyn
Saint Francis Brooklyn Terriers men's basketball
Saint Francis Brooklyn Terriers men's basketball